Dipogon subintermedius is a spider wasp from the family Pompilidae.

Identification
Like D. bifasciatus, this is an all-black species with bifasciated wings, but the female has shorter antennae than D. bifasciatus.

Distribution and habitat
Found from southern Great Britain north, it has an isolated population in the central Scottish Highlands, although the species has not been recorded in Ireland, through central and eastern Europe east to Mongolia.  It is the most common of the three species of Dipogon found in Britain.

It prefers woodland and hedgerows where dead wood is present to provide breeding sites.

Biology
In Britain, this wasp flies from June to September.  The only recorded prey in Britain is a species of spider Segestria senoculata from the family Segestriidae, but elsewhere, spiders of the genus Clubiona (Clubionidae) have been recorded as prey.  The spider is carried to the wasp's nest by its spinnerets, and prey is then malaxated, which may be a process by which the wasp obtains proteins necessary to produce eggs; certainly, wasps of the genus Dipogon do not appear to visit flowers to obtain nectar.

The nest is usually constructed in an existing cavity, normally in wood, and old beetle excavations are often used, although cavities in masonry will also be used.  The cavity is normally sealed with spider silk, applied using the maxillary bristles which give the generic name to these wasps.  Records exist of two larvae of D. subintermedius on a single specimen of S. senoculata.

References

Hymenoptera of Europe
Pepsinae
Insects described in 1886